The New Hate: A History of Fear and Loathing on the Populist Right is a 2012 political science and public affairs non-fiction book by the writer and editor Arthur S. Goldwag, published by Pantheon Books. The book discusses the history of conspiracy theories among right-wing populists in the United States, in particular what Goldwag considers personalized economic conspiracy theories driven by fear and hate within the radical right and the contemporary Tea Party movement.

Background
Goldwag first became interested in sweeping, all-encompassing intellectual and belief-based narratives while performing research for his book,  Isms and Ologies: All the Movements, Ideologies and Doctrines That Have Shaped Our World (2007). That book was followed by Cults, Conspiracies, and Secret Societies (2009).  He is influenced by the style and work of historian Richard Hofstadter.

Synopsis
Goldwag covers conspiracy theories espoused by various groups and traces their shared historical precedents.  Theorists covered in the book include the birthers, the Birchers, and conservative talk radio hosts and politicians.

See also
The Paranoid Style in American Politics

References

Further reading
Adams, Philip. (2012, February 29) "The New Hate". Late Night Live. Radio National. 
Goldwag, Arthur. (2012, January 31). "The Rise Of The New Hate". The Huffington Post.
Goldwag, Arthur, (2012, February 5).  "American Haters: From John Adams to Barry Goldwater".  The Daily Beast.
"Goldwag, Arthur: The New Hate." Kirkus Reviews. 79 (24), 2300. December 15, 2011.
Moores, Alan. (2012, January). "Book Review." Booklist. 108 (9/10), 22. 
"The New Hate". California Bookwatch. Midwest Book Review. 2012. Retrieved December 7, 2012. 
"The New Hate: A History of Fear and Loathing on the Populist Right". Publishers Weekly. 258 (51), 45. December 19, 2011.
Weinberg, Steve. (2012, March). "There Will Be Paranoia". In These Times, 36 (3). Retrieved December 7, 2012. 
Zaitchik, Alexander. (2012, March 4). "FDL Book Salon Welcomes Arthur Goldwag, The New Hate: A History of Fear and Loathing on the Populist Right." fdlbooksalon.com.

External links
Random House official site
Author's site

Books about politics of the United States
Books about conspiracy theories
Books about the far right
2012 non-fiction books
Pantheon Books books